ATON LLC is one of the oldest investment companies in Russia. It was founded in 1991, sold to UniCredit group in 2007 and recreated in 2009. ATON operates in 30 Russian cities. ATON’s headquarter is in Moscow.

History
December 20, 2006 ATON Capital Group announced that it sold 100% of its institutional business which includes ZAO Aton Broker and Aton International Ltd (together, the “Aton Institutional Business”) to Bank Austria Creditanstalt AG (“BA-CA”), a member of UniCredit Group, for US$424 million in cash and signed a 3-years non-compete agreement. ATON offers investment, brokerage, asset management, corporate finance and merger and acquisition services on both Russian and international markets.

In 2016 ATON introduced ATON SPACE – the first platform for HNWI investors.

References

Sources

 ATON History

External links
 Official website

Russian investment banks
Companies based in Moscow
Banks established in 1991
1991 establishments in Russia